Yakima Peak is a 6,226-ft (1,898 m) summit located on the eastern border of Mount Rainier National Park. It is also on the shared border of Pierce County and Yakima County in Washington state. Yakima Peak is situated northwest of Tipsoo Lake and west of Chinook Pass on the crest of the Cascade Range. Its nearest higher neighbor is Deadwood Peak,  to the north. The name Yakima Peak honors the Yakima Tribe of eastern Washington state. From Chinook Pass, a short scramble up a gully on the north side leads to a flat summit with unobstructed views of Mount Rainier and Naches Peak.

Climate
Yakima Peak is located in the marine west coast climate zone of western North America. Most weather fronts originate in the Pacific Ocean, and travel northeast toward the Cascade Mountains. As fronts approach, they are forced upward by the peaks of the Cascade Range (Orographic lift), causing them to drop their moisture in the form of rain or snowfall onto the Cascades. As a result, the west side of the Cascades experiences high precipitation, especially during the winter months in the form of snowfall. During winter months, weather is usually cloudy, but, due to high pressure systems over the Pacific Ocean that intensify during summer months, there is often little or no cloud cover during the summer. Because of maritime influence, snow tends to be wet and heavy, resulting in high avalanche danger. Yakima Peak is a major triple divide point with precipitation runoff draining into tributaries of the White River, Cowlitz River, and Yakima River.

See also
 Geography of Washington (state)

References

External links
 Weather forecast: Yakima Peak
 National Park Service web site: Mount Rainier National Park

Cascade Range
Mountains of Pierce County, Washington
Mountains of Washington (state)
Mountains of Yakima County, Washington